The Hybrid Coordinate Ocean Model (HyCOM) is an open-source ocean general circulation modeling system. HyCOM is a primitive equation type of ocean general circulation model. The vertical levels of this modeling system are slightly different than other models, because the vertical coordinates remain isopycnic in the open stratified ocean, smoothly transitioning to z-level coordinates in the weakly stratified upper-ocean mixed layer, to terrain-following sigma coordinates in shallow water regions, and back to z-level coordinates in very shallow water.   Therefore, the setup is a “hybrid” between z-level and terrain-following vertical levels. HyCOM outputs are provided online for the global ocean at a spatial resolution of 0.08 degrees (approximately 9 km) from 2003 to present. HyCOM uses netCDF data format for model outputs.

Applications 
HyCOM model experiments are used to study the interactions between the ocean and atmosphere, including short-term and long-term processes. This modeling system has also been used to create forecasting tools. For example, HyCOM has been used to:
 Assimilate data and provide operational oceanographic forecasting for the United States Navy 
 Determine the ideal way to parametrize how the sun heats the upper ocean (solar radiation and heat flux) in darker waters like the Black Sea 
 Study mesoscale variability in sea surface height and temperature in the Gulf of Mexico 
 Simulate drifting patterns of loggerhead sea turtles of the North American east coast
 Predict the extent of Arctic sea ice for naval operations

See also 
Climate model
Computational geophysics
General circulation model (GCM)
Ocean general circulation model (OGCM)
Oceanography
List of ocean circulation models
Physical oceanography
ROMS
Sigma coordinate system

References

External links 
https://www.hycom.org/

Physical oceanography
Oceanography
Earth system sciences
Computational science
Geophysics
Numerical climate and weather models